The 2019 Gateshead Metropolitan Borough Council election took place on 2 May 2019 to elect members of the Gateshead Metropolitan Borough Council in England. It was held on the same day as other local elections.

Results summary

Ward results

Birtley

Blaydon

Bridges

Chopwell and Rowlands Gill

Chowdene

Crawbrook and Greenside

Deckham

Dunston and Teams

Dunston Hill and Whickham East

Felling

High Fell

Lamesley

Lobley Hill and Bensham

Low Fell

Pelaw and Heworth

Ryton, Crookhill and Stella

Saltwell

Wardley and Leam Lane

Whickham North

Whickham South and Sunniside

Windy Nook and Whitehills

Winlaton and High Spen

References

2019 English local elections
May 2019 events in the United Kingdom
2019
21st century in Tyne and Wear